Saint-Bonnet-le-Froid (Vivaro-Alpine: Sant Bonet lo Freid) is a commune in the Haute-Loire department in south-central France.

Population

Personalities
 Régis Marcon - 3 Michelin-starred chef, winner of the Bocuse gold medal in 1995 and owner of the Clos des Cimes restaurant.

See also
Communes of the Haute-Loire department

References

Communes of Haute-Loire